Oleksandr Vasyliovych Sitkovskyi or Oleksandr Sitkovskyy (born 9 June 1978) is a Ukrainian long-distance runner. At the 2012 Summer Olympics, he competed in the Men's marathon, finishing in 12th place.  He also competed at the 2008 Summer Olympics, but did not finish the course.

In 2021, he competed in the men's marathon at the 2020 Summer Olympics held in Tokyo, Japan.

References

External links

Ukrainian male long-distance runners
Ukrainian male marathon runners
Living people
People from Zhovti Vody
Olympic athletes of Ukraine
Athletes (track and field) at the 2008 Summer Olympics
Athletes (track and field) at the 2012 Summer Olympics
1978 births
Athletes (track and field) at the 2020 Summer Olympics
Olympic male marathon runners
Sportspeople from Dnipropetrovsk Oblast